This is a list of commercial banks in Cape Verde.

 Banco Africano de Investimentos
 Banco Cabo-Verdiano de Negócios
 Banco Comercial do Atlântico
 Banco Internacional de Cabo Verde
 Banco Inter-Atlântico
 Bank of Cape Verde
 Caixa Económica de Cabo Verde
 Ecobank
 
 Novo Banco de Cabo Verde

External links
 Website of Bank of Cape Verde (Portuguese)

See also
 List of banks in Africa

References

First Bank Of Cape Verde

 
Banks
Cape Verde
Cape Verde